Fukomys is a genus described in 2006 of common mole-rats, containing several species that were formerly placed in the genus Cryptomys; its species are endemic to Africa. The species contained in the genus includes : 

Fukomys amatus - Zambian mole-rat 
Fukomys anselli - Ansell's mole-rat 
Fukomys bocagei - Bocage's mole-rat
Fukomys damarensis - Damaraland mole-rat 
Fukomys darlingi - Mashona mole-rat 
Fukomys foxi - Nigerian mole-rat 
Fukomys hanangensis
Fukomys ilariae - Somali striped mole rat
Fukomys kafuensis - Kafue mole-rat 
Fukomys livingstoni
Fukomys mechowii - Mechow's mole-rat
Fukomys micklemi - Micklem's mole-rat
Fukomys occlusus
Fukomys ochraceocinereus - Ochre mole-rat
Fukomys vandewoestijneae - Caroline's mole rat 
Fukomys whytei
Fukomys zechi - Ghana mole-rat

References

 
Bathyergidae
Rodent genera
Rodents of Africa